Translocase of outer mitochondrial membrane 40 homolog (yeast), also known as TOMM40, is a protein which in humans is encoded by the TOMM40 gene.

Function

TOMM40 codes for a protein that is embedded into outer membranes of mitochondria and is required for the movement of proteins into mitochondria. More precisely, TOMM40 is the channel-forming subunit of a translocase of the mitochondrial outer membrane (TOM) that is essential for protein transport into mitochondria.

Clinical significance 

In humans, certain alleles of this gene have been statistically associated with an increased risk of developing late-onset Alzheimer's disease. One study has found that TOMM40 risk alleles appears twice as often in people with Alzheimer's disease than those without it.  Because  TOMM40 is located on chromosome 19, and is closely adjacent to APOE, another gene known to be associated with Alzheimer's, another study has suggested that the statistically significant correlation of TOMM40 with Alzheimer's is due to linkage disequilibrium.

See also
 Mitochondria Outer Membrane Translocase
 TOMM20
 TOMM22
 TOMM70A

References

Further reading
 

Mitochondrial proteins